Blutbahnen is the sixth studio album by the German dark metal band Eisregen, released through Massacre Records in 2007.

Track listing
"Auftakt: Eine kleine Schlachtmusik" – 1:37
"Eisenkreuzkrieger" – 4:20
"Im Dornenwall" – 4:36
"Ein Hauch von Räude" – 5:54
"17 Kerzen am Dom" – 6:27
"Blutbahnen" – 5:24
"Alphawolf" – 4:28
"Frischtot" – 4:17
"Schlachthaus-Blues" – 6:21
"Zurück in die Kolonie" – 6:11
"Schneuz den Kasper!" – 5:31

Credits
 Michael "Blutkehle" Roth − vocals
 Michael "Bursche" Lenz − guitar, bass
 Frau N. Feind - violin
 Daniel "DF" Fröbing - keyboards
 Ronny "Yantit" Fimmel − drums

2007 albums
Eisregen albums
Massacre Records albums